The Donald Trump 2020 presidential campaign launched numerous lawsuits contesting the election processes of Michigan. All of these were either dismissed or dropped.

Summary of post-election lawsuits

Bailey v. Antrim Cty. 
On November 23, 2020, William Bailey filed a lawsuit against Antrim County. Judge Kevin Elsenheimer ordered a forensic exam of the county's election equipment, and also allowed Michigan Secretary of State Jocelyn Benson to intervene in the case. The machines were forensically imaged by Russell James Ramsland, Jr., and the judge ordered the release of Ramsland's report. On December 14, Michigan's top election officials denounced the 23-page report.

Bally v. Whitmer 
On November 11, 2020, registered voters in Michigan sued state officials, including Governor Gretchen Whitmer, in federal district court. The voters alleged a variety of irregularities, including the exclusion of poll watchers from the canvassing process, and asked that votes from Wayne, Ingham, and Washtenaw Counties not be counted. The complaint cited similar cases Costantino v. Benson and Trump v. Benson. On November 16, the plaintiffs voluntarily dismissed the suit.

Costantino v. Detroit 
On November 9, Republican poll challengers filed a lawsuit in Wayne County Circuit Court against Detroit election officials, alleging fraud and misconduct during the vote count at TCF Center and asking for the court to stop the certification of Wayne County results. Chief Judge Timothy M. Kenny denied the petition, finding the "[p]laintiffs’ interpretation of events is incorrect and not credible." The judge stated that the plaintiffs did not fully comprehend the "TCF absent ballot tabulation process" because they failed to attend a familiarization session on October 29. The plaintiffs appealed to the state's court of appeals, which declined to hear the case; on November 23, the Michigan Supreme Court also declined to hear the case.

Donald J. Trump for President v. Benson (State court) 
The Trump campaign filed suit in Michigan State Court on November 4 against Michigan Secretary of State Jocelyn Benson, claiming its election observers were not allowed to view the ballot count, as required by Michigan law, and asking the court to stop the counting of votes.

On November 6, Judge Cynthia Stephens denied the request, noting in her ruling that the "essence of the count is completed, and the relief is completely unavailable". The judge also noted the official complaint did not state "why", "when, where, or by whom" an election observer was allegedly blocked from observing ballot-counting in Michigan.

Donald J. Trump for President v. Benson (Federal court) 
On November 11, 2020, the Trump campaign filed suit in federal district court against Michigan Secretary of State Jocelyn Benson. The campaign asked the court to block Michigan's certification of the vote, repeating allegations found in Constantino v. Detroit. The campaign provided hundreds of pages of affidavits from poll challengers that "described isolated grievances and perceived irregularities, not systemic fraud." On November 19, the Trump campaign voluntarily dismissed the case.

Johnson v. Benson (Federal court) 
On November 16, 2020, registered voters and poll challengers from Michigan sued Secretary of State Jocelyn Benson in federal district court. The plaintiffs claimed the secretary enabled fraud on election day, and asked to block certification of the vote results until an audit could be performed. On November 18, the plaintiffs voluntarily dismissed the suit.

Johnson v. Benson (State court) 
On November 26, 2020, the Amistad Project filed Angelic Johnson, et al. v. Jocelyn Benson, et al. as an extraordinary writ in the Michigan State Supreme Court.

King v. Whitmer 
On November 25, 2020, a group of voters filed a lawsuit in the United States District Court Eastern District of Michigan against Gretchen Whitmer, the Governor of Michigan, and other state officials. The plaintiffs alleged a variety of violations of the Election Code and as a remedy, asked the court to decertify the state's election results or certify them for Trump. This was one of the 'Kraken' cases litigated by conservative lawyer Sidney Powell.

On December 7, Judge Linda V. Parker denied the plaintiffs requested relief, saying it "greatly harms the public interest" and that the "ship has sailed." Parker further stated that the plaintiffs only offered "theories, conjecture, and speculation" of potential vote switching. The judge felt that the plaintiffs’ real motive for filing the case was not to win, but to shake "people's faith in the democratic process and their trust in our government."

On December11, the plaintiffs filed a petition for a writ of certiorari at the Supreme Court of the United States. This petition was denied.

The city and state asked the court for sanctions against the plaintiff's lawyers. The court ordered the plaintiff and their lawyers to be jointly and severely liable for the city and state's legal fees, and ordered that plaintiff's counsel attend legal education courses. The court also ordered a copy of the decision be sent to the disciplinary authority of each lawyer's bar association for investigation and possible suspension or disbarment.

Stoddard v. City Election Comm'n of the City of Detroit 
The conservative group Election Integrity Fund filed a lawsuit in the Third Judicial Circuit of Michigan asking for a motion of injunctive relief ordering Detroit election workers to stop "curing" absentee ballots. Chief Judge Timothy Kenny denied the motion for injunctive relief on November 6, finding that the plaintiffs did "not offer any affidavits or specific eyewitness evidence to substantiate their assertions... Plaintiffs' allegation is mere speculation. Plaintiffs' pleadings do not set forth a cause of action." The judge noted that "sinister, fraudulent motives" were alleged, but that the "plaintiffs' interpretation of events is incorrect and not credible". Following Kenny's ruling, Dana Nessel, Michigan's attorney general, issued a statement saying Michigan has "always been committed to a fair, transparent[,] and secure election that ensures every legal vote is counted".

References 

Post-election lawsuits related to the 2020 United States presidential election
United States lawsuits